The East Indian Archipelago is an area designated by the International Hydrographic Organization (IHO). It encompasses twelve seas, two gulfs, and one strait in the East Indies (Southeast Asia).

Seas
In draft 4 of the IHO's publication S-23 Limits of Oceans and Seas, 2002, the area is described in a chapter under the heading South China & Eastern Archipelagic Seas.

The waters of the East Indian Archipelago are:

 Banda Sea - 
 Arafura Sea - 
 Timor Sea - 
 Java Sea - 
 Celebes Sea - 
 Sulu Sea - 
 Molucca Sea - 
 Seram Sea - 
 Flores Sea - 
 Halmahera Sea - 
 Bali Sea - 
 Savu Sea - 
 Gulf of Boni
 Gulf of Tomini
 Makassar Strait

Six of the seas, the two gulfs, and the strait are wholly waters of Indonesia. The Sulu Sea, lying between the Philippines and Sabah (a state of Malaysia on the island of Borneo), is not in Indonesian waters. The other five seas are partially Indonesian.

Five countries have exclusive economic zones (EEZ) that extend into one or more of the five seas that are partially Indonesian. Apart from the  Sulu Sea, Philippine and  Malaysian EEZs also extend into the Celebes Sea. The East Timor EEZ is wholly within the Savu, Banda, and Timor Seas. Australia's EEZ extends into both the Timor and Arafura Seas and Papua New Guinea's EEZ extends into the Arafura Sea from its far southwest coast.

See also
 Australasian Mediterranean Sea
 Maritime Southeast Asia

References

Seas of Indonesia